Randy Skinner is an American dancer, director and choreographer, primarily for the stage.  He has been nominated four times for Tony Awards, three times for Drama Desk Awards, and four times for Outer Critics Circle Awards for choreography.

Early life and education
Skinner was born in Columbus, Ohio. He attended Upper Arlington High School where he was valedictorian, and graduated from Ohio State University, with a major in speech and communication and a minor in psychology.

Career
Skinner began his professional career with the well known Kenley Players, dancing in numerous productions such as The Pajama Game, No No Nanette, Anything Goes, Mack and Mabel, Funny Girl, Grease, and Walking Happy, all produced by John Kenley. He moved to New York in 1976 seeking dancing jobs. In 1979 he danced in Radio City Music Hall's A New York Summer which was the premiere production of the newly re-opened and landmarked theatre. Gower Champion asked him to be a dance assistant on 42nd Street in 1980.  In 1985, Ginger Rogers cast him as Val opposite Karen Ziemba and asked him to choreograph a production of Babes in Arms that she directed in upstate New York and in Connecticut. Other performances include playing Pa Dolan in the City Center Encores! On Your Toes, Bobby in the National Tour of A Chorus Line, and dancing in the premiere production of the American Dance Machine at Ford's Theatre.

His Broadway work as a choreographer includes Dames at Sea (also directing). Skinner said that he played the role of "Dick" and choreographed Dames At Sea in an Ohio State University production in 1973, as an undergraduate. Skinner noted that "My influence has always been from the movies." He added "I'm very protective of my dancers. If I'm choreographing a trick or a lift, I always consider, "Can this be done eight times a week joyfully and safely without the dancer fretting about it?"

Other work includes Irving Berlin's White Christmas and State Fair. He choreographed the Broadway revival of 42nd Street in 2001 and also choreographed and staged the London, Germany, Australia and two U.S. national companies and the Amsterdam production of the musical. He has choreographed many productions for the City Center Encores! series, including Do Re Mi (1999), Of Thee I Sing (May 2006), Face The Music (March 2007), No, No Nanette (May 2008), Gentlemen Prefer Blondes (May 2012) and Lady Be Good (February 2015).  His Off-Broadway and regional theatre choreography work includes productions of Irving Berlin's White Christmas around the U.S. and the UK, Garry Marshall's Happy Days (2006 in Los Angeles), Lone Star Love (2004 Off-Broadway; 2007 Seattle), Babes in Arms (2002 at the Goodspeed Opera House), Abby's Song (1999 Off-Broadway, also directing) and Lucky in the Rain (1997 at Goodspeed). He has received the Los Angeles Drama Critics Circle Award, Drama-Logue Award, and Connecticut Critics Circle Award among others. He has received the Hoofer Award from the American Tap Dance Foundation (2009) and the Flo-Bert Award (2010). Skinner's tap dancing has been heard on numerous recordings including Lucky In The Rain, Sondheim At The Movies, 110 In The Shade, and Strike Up The Band.

On September 11, 2017 Skinner directed the inaugural production of the Chita Rivera Awards for Dance and Choreography held at the Hirschfeld Theatre.

Teaching career
In addition to his theatrical career, Skinner is also a guest teacher at various colleges and universities and at both Steps On Broadway and Broadway Dance Center in NYC.
The Randy Skinner Collection was established at Ohio State University's Jerome Lawrence and Robert E. Lee Theatre Research Institute, with his notes, scripts, playbills, posters, and personal papers.

Work
(As choreographer, except as otherwise noted)

42nd Street 2022 Goodspeed Opera (also Director) 

Dames At Sea 2022 Bucks County Playhouse (also Director) 

Cheek To Cheek: Irving Berlin In Hollywood 2021 Off-Broadway York Theatre (also Conceiver/Director) 

42nd Street 2017 West End

Dames at Sea 2015 Broadway (also Director)

Lady Be Good 2015 City Center Encores!

Irving Berlin's White Christmas 2014 West End

Show Boat 2014 Lincoln Center with the NY Philharmonic Orchestra

Gentlemen Prefer Blondes 2012 City Center Encores!

Lend Me A Tenor 2011 West End

Irving Berlin's White Christmas 2008/2009 Broadway

No, No Nanette 2008 City Center Encores!

Face the Music 2007 City Center Encores!

Happy Days (musical) 2006 Los Angeles, California

Of Thee I Sing 2006 City Center Encores!

After the Night and the Music 2005 Broadway (also dance music arranger)

The Ballad of Bonnie and Clyde 2005 New York: Theatre at St. Clements

Irving Berlin's White Christmas 2004 & 2005 San Francisco, Los Angeles and Boston

Lone Star Love 2004 Off-Broadway - 2007 Seattle (also Director)

Babes in Arms 2002 Goodspeed Opera House

42nd Street 2001 Broadway revival

George M! 2000 Goodspeed Opera House

Abby's Song 1999 Off-Broadway (also Director)

Do Re Mi 1999 City Center Encores!

Lucky in the Rain 1997 Goodspeed Opera House

State Fair 1996 Broadway (also Co-Director)

Ain't Broadway Grand 1993 Broadway

Babes in Arms 1985 New York and Connecticut

42nd Street 1980 Broadway (dance assistant to Gower Champion)

Awards and nominations
2022 Lucille Lortel Award for Best Choreography (nominated) - Cheek To Cheek: Irving Berlin In Hollywood

2018 Olivier Award for Best Theatre Choreographer (nominated) - 42nd Street

2018 WhatsOnStage Award for Best Choreography (won) - 42nd Street

2016 Tony Award for Best Choreography (nominated) - Dames at Sea

2016 Drama Desk Award for Outstanding Choreography (nominated) - Dames at Sea

2016 Outer Critics Circle Award for Outstanding Choreography (nominated) - Dames at Sea

2009 Tony Award for Best Choreography (nominated) - Irving Berlin's White Christmas

2009 Drama Desk Award for Outstanding Choreography (nominated) - Irving Berlin's White Christmas

2004 Lucille Lortel Award for Best Choreography (nominated) - Lone Star Love

2001 Tony Award for Best Choreography (nominated) - 42nd Street

2001 Drama Desk Award for Outstanding Choreography (nominated) - 42nd Street

2001 Outer Critics Circle Award for Outstanding Choreography (nominated) - 42nd Street

1996 Outer Critics Circle Award for Outstanding Choreography (nominated) - State Fair

1993 Tony Award for Best Choreography (nominated) - Ain't Broadway Grand

1993 Outer Critics Circle Award for Outstanding Choreography (nominated) - Ain't Broadway Grand

References

External links

Internet Off-Broadway listing

American choreographers
Living people
Artists from Columbus, Ohio
Ohio State University College of Education and Human Ecology alumni
Year of birth missing (living people)
American male dancers
American tap dancers